Tom  or Thomas Barton may refer to:

 Thomas Barton (divine) (1730–1780), Irish divine
 Thomas Barton (Medal of Honor) (1831–?), American Medal of Honor recipient
 Thomas Barton (Royalist) (died 1681/2), Royalist divine
 Thomas Barton (Irish MP) (1757–1820), Irish landowner and politician
 Thomas J. Barton (born 1940), American chemist
 Thomas Pennant Barton (1803–1869), American diplomat and bibliophile
 Tom Barton (politician) (born 1949), Australian politician
 Tom Barton (rugby league) (1883–1958), English professional rugby league footballer